Newtown Township may refer to several places in the United States:

 Newtown Township, Livingston County, Illinois
 Newtown Township, Bucks County, Pennsylvania
 Newtown Township, Delaware County, Pennsylvania

See also 
 Newtown (disambiguation)
 Newton Township (disambiguation)

Township name disambiguation pages